Suwannee River State Park is a Florida State Park located near Live Oak. It offers some of the best backcountry canoeing opportunities in the state. Visitors can see cypress trees, southern magnolia, herons, American coots, turtles and hawks. The park is open year-round.

Recreational Activities
The park has such amenities as birding, boating, cabins, canoeing, fishing, hiking, kayaking, picnicking areas, wildlife viewing and full camping facilities. Snorkeling, swimming, and scuba diving are not permitted, but are available at nearby Falmouth and Ellaville springs.

See also

 Suwannee Springs
 Lower Suwannee National Wildlife Refuge
 Twin Rivers State Forest

External links
 Suwannee River State Park at Florida State Parks
 Suwannee River State Park at State Parks of the United States
 Suwannee River State Park at Absolutely Florida

Gallery

Parks in Suwannee County, Florida
State parks of Florida